Vasile Tărâțeanu (27 September 1945 – 8 August 2022) was a Ukrainian writer and activist of Romanian ethnicity.

Biography 
Vasile Tărâțeanu was born to Elena and Dumitru Tărâțeanu on 27 September 1945. He graduated from the Chernivtsi University in 1972. Vasile Tărâțeanu worked for the Romanian-language newspaper Zorile Bucovinei (1969–1981) and for Radio Kiev (1981–1991).

In 1989, he founded the Mihai Eminescu Society for Romanian Culture and in 2000, he became the president of the House of the Romanian Language Cultural Foundation in Chernivtsi. He was editor in chief of Plai românesc (1990–1994), Arcașul", Curierul de Cernăuți and Junimea.

Tărâțeanu was a leader of the Democratic Forum of Romanians in Moldova. He died on 8 August 2022, at the age of 76.

 Awards 
 Premiul revistei "Poesis" (1994; 2000).
 Premiul Societății Scriitorilor Bucovineni  (2001).
 Prize of The Moldovan Writers' Union (Premiul Uniunii Scriitorilor din Republica Moldova) (2003).

 Works 
 Harpele ploii, 1981
 Dreptul la neliniște (Uzhhorod, 1984);
 Linia vieții (Uzhhorod, 1988);
 Teama de înstrăinare (Chișinău, 1990);
 Litanii din Țara de Sus (Timișoara, Ed. Augusta, 1995);
 Litanii (Iași, 1996);
 Pământ în retragere (Timișoara, Editura Augusta, 1999);
 Și ne izbăveşte pre noi (Timișoara, Editura Helicon, 1999);
 Dinafară (Timişoara, Editura Augusta, 2003) etc.
 Ochean cu cioburi sângerânde (Cluj-Napoca, Editura Dacia, 2005);
 Infern personal, ediție bilingvă: în română și în franceză (Iași, Editura Danaster, 2005);
 Crucificat pe harta țării, Vasile Tărâțeanu – 60, volum omagial, (București, Editura Semne, 2005);
 Aruncarea zarurilor, in Colecția Biblioteca Revistei "Convorbiri literare"  (Iași, Editura Timpul, 2005);
 Orizonturi decapitate (Timișoara, Editura Augusta, 2005);
 Degețelul salvator, versuri pentru copii, în colecția "Biblioteca revistei Făgurel (Cernauți, Editura Zoloti Lytavry, 2006);
 Cimitir ambulant (Râmnicu Sărat, Editura RaFet, 2008).
 Iluzii și lanțuri (Craiova, Editura Scrisul Românesc, 2001)
 Stâlpul de foc'' (Craiova, Editura Scrisul Românesc, 2007).

References

External links 
 Biografie Vasile Tărâțeanu

1945 births
2022 deaths
Chernivtsi University alumni
Honorary members of the Romanian Academy
Romanian poets
Ukrainian poets
Romanian writers
Ukrainian writers
Romanian radio journalists
Ukrainian radio journalists
Ukrainian people of Romanian descent
People from Chernivtsi Oblast